Prithvi Chand Vigyan College also known as PC Vigyan College or PC Science College is a degree college in Chhapra, Bihar, India. It is a constituent unit of Jai Prakash University. The college offers intermediate and three years degree course (TDC) in arts and science.

History 
The college was established in the year 1971. In 1980, it became a constituent unit of Babasaheb Bhimrao Ambedkar Bihar University. Later on, in 1992, the college became a constituent unit of Jai Prakash University.

Departments 
The college offers bachelor's degree in following disciples.

 Arts
 Hindi
 Urdu
  English
 Philosophy
 Economics
 Political Science
 History
 Psychology
 Science
 Mathematics
 Physics
 Chemistry
 Zoology
 Botany

References

External links 

 Official website
 Jai Prakash University website

Colleges in India
Constituent colleges of Jai Prakash University
Educational institutions established in 1971
1971 establishments in Bihar